The Colgate Series Championships, later named the Toyota Championships were the finales in an annual series of professional women's tennis tournaments for women from 1977 through 1982. The best singles and doubles players of the circuit, based on ranking points earned, qualified for the championships. During those years, the women's tour included a US indoor circuit winter tour finale, called the Virginia Slims Championships in 1977-78 and the Avon Championships in the 1979-82 period, as well as the global world tour finale, held in the US fall season, and called the Colgate Series Championships in 1977-80 and the Toyota Series Championships in 1981-82.

The championships were discontinued when Virginia Slims became the year-round sponsor of the Women's Tennis Association Tour in 1983.

Finals

Singles

Doubles

See also
 WTA Tour Championships

References

External links
 WTA official homepage

Defunct tennis tournaments in the United States
Hard court tennis tournaments in the United States